Aspidoderidae is a family of nematodes belonging to the order Rhabditida.

Genera:
 Aspidodera Railliet & Henry, 1912
 Cheloniheterakis Yamaguti, 1961
 Lauroia Proença, 1938
 Narsingiella Rao, 1978
 Nematomystes Sutton, Chabaud & Durette-Desset, 1980
 Pseudaspidodera
 Sexansodera Skrjabin & Schikhobalova, 1947

References

Nematodes